Nodocapitus inornatus is a species of velvet worm in the family Peripatopsidae. The type locality of this species is Gibralter Range National Park, New South Wales, Australia. This species has 15 pairs of legs in both sexes. The males are distinguished by enlarged papillae on the head, between the antennae.

References

Further reading 
 

Onychophorans of Australasia
Onychophoran species
Animals described in 1996